Allerbach is a river of Lower Saxony, Germany.

The Allerbach springs near , a district of Einbeck.

See also
List of rivers of Lower Saxony

References

Rivers of Lower Saxony
Rivers of Germany